Fox Hollow is a valley in Rensselaer County of the U.S. state of New York.

The University of the State of New York speculates the valley may be named after Levit Fox, or after foxes in the area.

References

Landforms of Rensselaer County, New York
Valleys of New York (state)